Charles John Chenery (1 January 1850 – 17 April 1928) was a footballer who played for England in the first international match against Scotland. He also played cricket for Surrey and Northants.

Football career
Chenery was born in Lambourn, Berkshire, the son of George Chenery and Sophia Atkins. He was educated at the Marlborough Royal Free Grammar School, although the family also spent three or four years in Australia in the early 1860s. After leaving school he joined the original Crystal Palace club and was selected for the "England" side that played an unofficial international match against a Scottish side in February 1872. He was retained for the first official international match which took place on 30 November 1872 at West of Scotland Cricket Club's ground at Hamilton Crescent in Partick, Scotland. The match finished in a 0–0 draw, with Chenery playing as one of seven or eight forwards.

He and Harwood Greenhalgh were the only two players who were recalled for the return match at the Kennington Oval, London on 8 March 1873, which resulted in a 4–2 victory for England, with Chenery, playing at inside right, scoring the fourth goal. Chenery's Crystal Palace teammate Alexander Morten played in goal for England.

He made his third and final England appearance (again against Scotland) in a 2–1 defeat on 7 March 1874 and was the only player to appear in each of England's first three internationals. He also played occasionally for the Wanderers and, although not appearing in any of their five FA Cup Final teams in the 1870s, he did serve as their secretary in 1871.

At some time he appeared for the Barnes Club as well as representing Surrey and London.

Cricket career
He played cricket for Surrey in 1872 and 1873 as a right-hand batsman and right-arm fast bowler. His top score was 40 n.o. at the Oval against Kent in August 1872.

He also played for Northants before that county was elevated to first-class status.

Later life
Chenery emigrated to Australia in 1878, settling in Mansfield, Victoria, where he had relatives. He married Priscilla Swan in 1890, and they had three sons. He died at Mansfield on 17 April 1928.

References

External links

England profile
Profile at cricketarchive.com
cricinfo profile

1850 births
1928 deaths
People from Lambourn
English footballers
England international footballers
Wanderers F.C. players
Crystal Palace F.C. (1861) players
Barnes Club footballers
English cricketers
Surrey cricketers
Northamptonshire cricketers
England v Scotland representative footballers (1870–1872)
Surrey Club cricketers
Association football inside forwards